The Australian Boys' Amateur is the nations premier junior golf championship for boys. It is run by Golf Australia.  It is a 72-hole stroke-play event for players under the age of 18. Until 1993 the age limit was 21.

Winners

Source:

See also
Golf Australia National Squad
Australian Open
Australian Amateur

References

Amateur golf tournaments in Australia
Youth sport in Australia